Lick Run is a  long 1st order tributary to Kings Creek in Hancock County, West Virginia.

Course
Lick Run rises about 3 miles northeast of Sun Valley, West Virginia, in Hancock County, West Virginia and then flows south to join Kings Creek about 1 mile northeast of Weirton.

Watershed
Lick Run drains  of area, receives about 39.3 in/year of precipitation, has a wetness index of 285.38, and is about 81% forested.

See also
List of Rivers of West Virginia

References

Rivers of West Virginia
Rivers of Hancock County, West Virginia